This is a list of the Iraq national football team results from 2000 to 2009.

Results

2000s

2001

2002

2003

2004

2005

2006

2007

2008

2009

See also
Iraq national football team results

References

External links
Iraq fixtures on eloratings.net
Iraq on soccerway.com

2000s in Iraqi sport
2000